is a Japanese diplomat. Akao entered the Japanese Ministry of Foreign Affairs in 1961. Served as Japanese Ambassador to Thailand from November 1999 to December 2002.

References

External links
 Official profile 

Living people
Ambassadors of Japan to Thailand
1937 births